Sadullah Ergin (born 6 July 1964) is a Turkish politician.

Biography
Ergin was born to Mehmet İsmet Ergin and Hatice Ergin in Antakya. He completed his primary and secondary education there and then studied at the Uludağ University Economics and Social Sciences Faculty in Bursa for one year. He continued his studies at the Ankara University Faculty of Law, graduating in 1987. Following the completion of his military service, he served as a lawyer for the Regional Directorate for Foundations of Hatay for five years. He resigned in 1995 and began to work as a self-employed lawyer. He has been at the management position of several association and societies.

Ergin is a founding member of the ruling Justice and Development Party (AKP). Beginning 3 November 2002, he was member of the Turkish parliament for three terms from Hatay Province representing the Justice and Development Party. On 1 May 2009, Ergin became the Minister of Justice in the second cabinet of Erdoğan.

On 25 December 2013, amidst the 2013 corruption scandal in Turkey, Prime Minister Erdogan replaced him as Minister of Justice in a government reshuffle. The reason given for his departure was that he had decided to stand as a candidate in Hatay Province in the March 2014 local elections.

Ergin is one of the founding members of Ali Babacan's newly formed Democracy and Progress Party.

Ergin is married, has four children, and speaks English.

References

External links 
  Biography of Sadullah Ergin at the website of AK Party

Government ministers of Turkey
1964 births
Living people
Deputies of Hatay
Justice and Development Party (Turkey) politicians
Democracy and Progress Party politicians
People from Antakya
Ministers of Justice of Turkey
Members of the 24th Parliament of Turkey
Members of the 23rd Parliament of Turkey
Members of the 22nd Parliament of Turkey
Members of the 60th government of Turkey